Harris: On The Edge is the first concert tour by an Indian composer Harris Jayaraj. The tour will commence in India and will proceed to Europe, South Africa and North America. The tour will also feature the original singers crooning the numbers.

Background 
In 2011, Harris announced a musical world tour titled "Harris on the Edge". He will be performing live all over the world accompanied by a troupe of Tamil playback singers, including Karthik, Haricharan, Chinmayi, Tippu, Harini Naresh Iyer, Harish Raghavendra, Krish, Aalap Raju, Kay Kay, Benny Dayal, Andrea, Chinmayi, Megha, Suvi Suresh, Sunitha Sarathy, Srilekha Parthasarathy and Shweta Mohan and international musicians and dancers. The event will be coordinated by Techfront and is to be directed by A. L. Vijay. The stage will reportedly be among the biggest in the world, with a 270-degree view, a first of its kind in the world. The concert would feature a futuristic video technology complementing music strains of the composer and will have 3D visuals for audience, interactive visuals, special artiste with unique choreography and engagement with spectators.

Tour 
Tour was to kick start in Chennai on 2 October 2011 but was postponed to 8 October 2011, due to inclement weather. The tour was about to continue in Coimbatore on 16 October 2011, however due to unfavorable weather conditions the concert was again postponed to 24 December 2011, with Harris apologizing his fans via social network. The Coimbatore was later held on 23 December 2011 along with Nanban audio launch. The tour continued in Dubai on 4 February 2012.

The tour will continue in Madurai, which was added in later part owing to fans demand, Hyderabad, Kuala Lumpur. The second phase of the tour will begin in early 2012 which will be performed in Europe, South Africa and North America. Harris revealed that he has kept aside his film scoring works and has not committed to any new projects of-late.

Television rights 
Television rights for the tour was bought by Jaya TV, one of a major Tamil language satellite television channels based in Chennai, India.

Tour dates

Concert synopsis

Chennai - 8 October 2011

References

External links 
 

2011 concert tours
Harris Jayaraj concert tours
2011 in India